Montserrat–United Kingdom relations refer to relations between the United Kingdom and its overseas territory Montserrat.

Montserrat is an overseas territory of the United Kingdom, and both because of and despite that the UK must have somewhat formal relations.

The Representative of Montserrat in London is the diplomatic mission of the British Overseas Territory of Montserrat in the United Kingdom. It is located in the Kings Cross Business Centre, a multi-use office building in Kings Cross. Unlike for most diplomatic missions, there is no flag or plaque indicating its existence.  The current representative is Janice Panton.

References

British Overseas Territories–United Kingdom relations
Government of Montserrat
Relations of colonizer and former colony